The Crisis of the Third Century, also known as the Military Anarchy or the Imperial Crisis (AD 235–284), was a period in which the Roman Empire nearly collapsed. The crisis ended due to the military victories of Aurelian and with the ascension of Diocletian and his implementation of reforms in 284.

The crisis began in 235 with the assassination of Emperor Severus Alexander by his own troops. During the following 50-year period, the Empire saw the combined pressures of barbarian invasions and migrations into Roman territory, civil wars, peasant rebellions and political instability, with multiple usurpers competing for power. This led to the debasement of currency and economic collapse, with the Plague of Cyprian contributing to the disorder. Roman troops became more reliant over time on the growing influence of the barbarian mercenaries known as foederati. Roman commanders in the field, although nominally working for Rome, became increasingly independent. 

By 268, the empire had split into three competing states: the Gallic Empire (including the Roman provinces of Gaul, Britannia and, briefly, Hispania); the Palmyrene Empire (including the eastern provinces of Syria Palaestina and Aegyptus); and, between them, the Italian-centered Roman Empire proper. 

There were at least 26 claimants to the title of emperor, mostly prominent Roman army generals, who assumed imperial power over all or part of the Empire. The same number of men became accepted by the Roman Senate as emperor during this period and so became legitimate emperors. Later, Aurelian (AD 270–275) reunited the empire militarily. The crisis ended with Diocletian and his restructuring of Roman imperial government in 284. This helped to stabilize the Empire economically and militarily for a further 150 years.

The crisis resulted in such profound changes in the empire's institutions, society, economic life, and religion that it is increasingly seen by most historians as defining the transition between the historical periods of classical antiquity and late antiquity.

History

After the Roman Empire had been stabilized, once again, after the turmoil of the Year of the Five Emperors (193) in the reign of Septimius Severus, the later Severan dynasty lost more and more control.

The army required larger and larger bribes to remain loyal. Septimius Severus raised the pay of legionaries, and gave substantial donativum to the troops. The large and ongoing increase in military expenditure caused problems for all of his successors. His son Caracalla raised the annual pay and lavished many benefits on the army in accordance with the advice of his father to keep their loyalty, and considered dividing the Empire into eastern and western sectors with his brother Geta to reduce the conflict in their co-rule. But with the major influence of their mother, Julia Domna, this division of the empire was not possible.

Instead of warring in foreign lands, the Roman empire was increasingly put on the defensive by marauding enemies and civil wars. This cut off the essential source of income gained from plundering enemy countries, while opening up the Roman countryside to economic devastation from looters both foreign and domestic. Frequent civil wars contributed to depletion of the army's manpower, and drafting replacement soldiers strained the labour force further. Fighting on multiple fronts, increasing size and pay of the army, increasing cost of transport, populist "bread and circuses" political campaigns, inefficient and corrupt tax collection, unorganised budgeting, and paying off foreign nations for peace all contributed to financial crisis. The emperors responded by confiscating assets and supplies to combat the deficit.

The situation of the Roman Empire became dire in 235. Many Roman legions had been defeated during a previous campaign against Germanic peoples raiding across the borders, while the emperor Severus Alexander had been focused primarily on the dangers from the Sassanid Empire. Leading his troops personally, the emperor resorted to diplomacy and accepting tribute to pacify the Germanic chieftains quickly, rather than military conquest. According to Herodian this cost Severus Alexander the respect of his troops, who may have felt that more severe punishment was required for the tribes that had intruded on Rome's territory. The troops assassinated Severus Alexander and proclaimed the new emperor to be Maximinus Thrax, commander of one of the legions present.

Maximinus was the first of the barracks emperors – rulers who were elevated by the troops without having any political experience, a supporting faction, distinguished ancestors, or a hereditary claim to the imperial throne. As their rule rested on military might and generalship, they operated as warlords reliant on the army to maintain power. Maximinus continued the campaigns in Germania but struggled to exert his authority over the whole empire. The Senate was displeased at having to accept a peasant as Emperor. This precipitated the chaotic Year of the Six Emperors during which all of the original claimants were killed: in 238 a revolt broke out in Africa led by Gordian I and Gordian II, which was soon supported by the Roman Senate, but this was quickly defeated with Gordian II killed and Gordian I committing suicide. The Senate, fearing Imperial wrath, raised two of their own as co-Emperors, Pupienus and Balbinus with Gordian I's grandson Gordian III as Caesar. Maximinus marched on Rome but was assassinated by his Legio II Parthica, and subsequently Pupienus and Balbinus were murdered by the Praetorian Guard.

In the following years, numerous generals of the Roman army fought each other for control of the empire and neglected their duties of defending it from invasion. There were frequent raids across the Rhine and Danube frontier by foreign tribes, including the Carpians, Goths, Vandals, and Alamanni, and attacks from Sassanids in the east. Climate changes and a sea level rise disrupted the agriculture of what is now the Low Countries, forcing tribes residing in the region to migrate into Roman lands. Further disruption arose in 251, when the Plague of Cyprian (possibly smallpox) broke out. This plague caused large-scale death, severely weakening the empire. The situation was worsened in 260 when the emperor Valerian was captured in battle by the Sassanids (he later died in captivity).

Throughout the period, numerous usurpers claimed the imperial throne. In the absence of a strong central authority, the empire broke into three competing states. The Roman provinces of Gaul, Britain, and Hispania broke off to form the Gallic Empire in 260. The eastern provinces of Syria, Palestine, and Aegyptus also became independent as the Palmyrene Empire in 267. The remaining provinces, centered on Italy, stayed under a single ruler but now faced threats on every side.

An invasion of Macedonia and Greece by Goths, who had been displaced from their lands on the Black Sea, was defeated by emperor Claudius II Gothicus at the Battle of Naissus in 268 or 269. Historians see this victory as the turning point of the crisis. In its aftermath, a series of tough, energetic barracks emperors were able to reassert central authority. Further victories by Claudius Gothicus drove back the Alamanni and recovered Hispania from the Gallic Empire. He died of the plague in 270 and was succeeded by Aurelian, who had commanded the cavalry at Naissus. Aurelian reigned (270–275) through the worst of the crisis, gradually restoring the empire. He defeated the Vandals, Visigoths, Palmyrene Empire, and finally the remainder of the Gallic Empire. By late 274, the Roman Empire had been reunited into a single entity. However, Aurelian was assassinated in 275, sparking a further series of competing emperors with short reigns. The situation did not stabilize until Diocletian, himself a barracks emperor, took power in 284.

More than a century would pass before Rome again lost military ascendancy over its external enemies. However, dozens of formerly thriving cities, especially in the Western Empire, had been ruined. Their populations dead or dispersed, these cities could not be rebuilt, due to the economic breakdown caused by constant warfare. The economy was also crippled by the breakdown in trading networks and the debasement of the currency. Major cities and towns, including Rome itself, had not needed fortifications for many centuries, but now surrounded themselves with thick walls.

Fundamental problems with the empire still remained. The right of imperial succession had never been clearly defined, which was a factor in the continuous civil wars as competing factions in the military, Senate, and other parties put forward their favored candidate for emperor. The sheer size of the empire, which had been an issue since the late Roman Republic three centuries earlier, continued to make it difficult for a single ruler to effectively counter multiple threats at the same time. These continuing problems were addressed by the radical reforms of Diocletian, who broke the cycle of usurpation. He began by sharing his rule with a colleague, then formally established the Tetrarchy of four co-emperors in 293. However the trend of civil war would continue after the abdication of Diocletian in the Civil wars of the Tetrarchy (306–324) until the rise of Constantine the Great as sole Emperor. The empire survived until 476 in the West and until 1453 in the East.

Causes

The problem of succession and civil war 
From the beginning of the Principate there were no clear rules for the imperial succession, largely because the empire maintained the facade of a republic.

During the early Principate, the process for becoming an emperor relied on a combination of proclamation by the Senate, popular approval, and acceptance by the army, in particular the Praetorian Guard. A family connection to a previous emperor was beneficial, but it did not determine the issue in the way a formal system of hereditary succession would. From the Julio-Claudian dynasty onwards there was sometimes tension between the Senate's preferred choice and the army. As the Senatorial class declined in political influence and more generals were recruited from the provinces this tension increased.

Whenever the succession appeared uncertain, there was an incentive for any general with support of a sizable army to attempt to seize power, sparking civil war. The most recent example of this prior to the Crisis was the Year of the Five Emperors which resulted in the victory of Septimius Severus. After the overthrow of the Severan dynasty, for the rest of the 3rd century, Rome was ruled by a series of generals, coming into power through frequent civil wars which devastated the empire.

Natural disasters 
The first and most immediately disastrous of the natural disasters that the Roman Empire faced during the Third Century was the plague. The Antonine Plague that preceded the Crisis of the Third Century sapped manpower from Roman armies and proved disastrous for the Roman economy. From AD 249 to AD 262, the Plague of Cyprian devastated the Roman Empire so much so that some cities, such as the city of Alexandria, experienced a 62% decline in population. These plagues greatly hindered the Roman Empire's ability to ward off barbarian invasions but also factored into problems such as famine, with many farms becoming abandoned and unproductive.

A second and longer-term natural disaster that took place during the third century was the increased variability of weather. Drier summers meant less agricultural productivity and more extreme weather events led to agricultural instability. This could also have contributed to the increased barbarian pressure on Roman borders, as they too would have experienced the detrimental effects of climate change and sought to push inward to more productive regions of the Mediterranean.

Foreign invasions 

Barbarian invasions came in the wake of civil war, plague, and famine.  Distress caused in part by the changing climate led various barbarian tribes to push into Roman territory.  Other tribes coalesced into more formidable entities (notably the Alamanni and Franks), or were pushed out of their former territories by more dangerous peoples such as the Sarmatians (the Huns did not appear west of the Volga for another century).  Eventually, the frontiers were stabilized by the Illyrian Emperors. However, barbarian migrations into the empire continued in greater and greater numbers. Though these migrants were initially  closely monitored and assimilated, later tribes eventually entered the Roman Empire en masse with their weapons, giving only token recognition of Roman authority.

The defensive battles that Rome had to endure on the Danube since the 230s, however, paled in comparison to the threat the empire faced in the East. There, Sassanid Persia represented a far greater danger to Rome than the isolated attacks of Germanic tribes. The Sassanids had in 224 and 226 overthrown the Parthian Arsacids, and the Persian King Ardashir I, who also wanted to prove his legitimacy through military successes, had already penetrated into Roman territory at the time of Severus Alexander, probably taking the strategically important cities of Nisibis and Carrhae in 235/236.

Economic impact

Internally, the empire faced hyperinflation caused by years of coinage devaluation. This had started earlier under the Severan emperors who enlarged the army by one quarter, and doubled the base pay of legionaries. As each of the short-lived emperors took power, they needed ways to raise money quickly to pay the military's "accession bonus" and the easiest way to do so was by inflating the coinage severely, a process made possible by debasing the coinage with bronze and copper.

This resulted in runaway rises in prices, and by the time Diocletian came to power, the old coinage of the Roman Empire had nearly collapsed. Some taxes were collected in kind and values often were notional, in bullion or bronze coinage. Real values continued to be figured in gold coinage, but the silver coin, the denarius, used for 300 years, was gone (1 pound of gold = 40 gold aurei = 1,000 denarii = 4,000 sestertii). This currency had almost no value by the end of the third century, and trade was carried out without retail coinage.

Breakdown of internal trade network 
One of the most profound and lasting effects of the Crisis of the Third Century was the disruption of Rome's extensive internal trade network. Ever since the Pax Romana, starting with Augustus, the empire's economy had depended in large part on trade between Mediterranean ports and across the extensive road systems to the Empire's interior. Merchants could travel from one end of the empire to the other in relative safety within a few weeks, moving agricultural goods produced in the provinces to the cities, and manufactured goods produced by the great cities of the East to the more rural provinces.

Large estates produced cash crops for export and used the resulting revenues to import food and urban manufactured goods. This resulted in a great deal of economic interdependence among the empire's inhabitants. The historian Henry St. Lawrence Beaufort Moss describes the situation as it stood before the crisis:

With the onset of the Crisis of the Third Century, however, this vast internal trade network broke down. The widespread civil unrest made it no longer safe for merchants to travel as they once had, and the financial crisis that struck made exchange very difficult with the debased currency. This produced profound changes that, in many ways, foreshadowed the very decentralized economic character of the coming Middle Ages.

Large landowners, no longer able to successfully export their crops over long distances, began producing food for subsistence and local barter. Rather than import manufactured goods from the empire's great urban areas, they began to manufacture many goods locally, often on their own estates, thus beginning the self-sufficient "house economy" that would become commonplace in later centuries, reaching its final form in the manorialism of the Middle Ages. The common, free people of the Roman cities, meanwhile, began to move out into the countryside in search of food and better protection.

Made desperate by economic necessity, many of these former city dwellers, as well as many small farmers, were forced to give up hard-earned basic civil rights in order to receive protection from large land-holders. In doing so, they became a half-free class of Roman citizen known as coloni. They were tied to the land, and in later Imperial law, their status was made hereditary. This provided an early model for serfdom, the origins of medieval feudal society and of the medieval peasantry. The decline in commerce between the imperial provinces put them on a path toward increased self-sufficiency. Large landowners, who had become more self-sufficient, became less mindful of Rome's central authority, particularly in the Western Empire, and were downright hostile toward its tax collectors. The measure of wealth at this time began to have less to do with wielding urban civil authority and more to do with controlling large agricultural estates in rural regions since this guaranteed access to the only economic resource of real value – agricultural land and the crops it produced. The common people of the empire lost economic and political status to the land-holding nobility, and the commercial middle classes waned along with their trade-derived livelihoods. The Crisis of the Third Century thus marked the beginning of a long gradual process that would transform the ancient world of classical antiquity into the medieval one of the Early Middle Ages.

However, although the burdens on the population increased, especially the lower strata of the population, this can not be generalized to the whole empire, especially since the living conditions were not uniform. Although the structural integrity of the economy suffered from the military conflicts of that time and the inflationary episode of the 270s, it did not collapse, especially because of the complex regional differences. Recent research has shown that there were regions that prospered even further, such as Egypt, Africa and Hispania. But even for Asia Minor, which was directly affected by attacks, no general decline can be observed. While commerce and the economy flourished in several regions, with several provinces not affected by hostilities, other provinces experienced some serious problems, as evidenced by personal hoards in the northwestern provinces of the empire. However, there can be no talk of a general economic crisis throughout the whole of Empire.

Even the Roman cities began to change in character. The large cities of classical antiquity slowly gave way to the smaller, walled cities that became common in the Middle Ages. These changes were not restricted to the third century, but took place slowly over a long period, and were punctuated with many temporary reversals. In spite of extensive reforms by later emperors, however, the Roman trade network was never able to fully recover to what it had been during the Pax Romana (27 BC – AD 180). This economic decline was far more noticeable and important in the western part of the empire, which was also invaded by barbarian tribes several times during the century. Hence, the balance of power clearly shifted eastward during this period, as evidenced by the choice of Diocletian to rule from Nicomedia in Asia Minor, putting his second in command, Maximian, in Milan. This would have a considerable impact on the later development of the empire with a richer, more stable eastern empire surviving the end of Roman rule in the west.

While imperial revenues fell, imperial expenses rose sharply. More soldiers, greater proportions of cavalry, and the ruinous expense of walling in cities all added to the toll. Goods and services previously paid for by the government were now demanded in addition to monetary taxes. The empire suffered from a crippling labour shortage. The steady exodus of both rich and poor from the cities and now-unprofitable professions forced Diocletian to use compulsion; conscription was made universal, most trades were made hereditary, and workers could not legally leave their jobs or travel elsewhere to seek better-paying ones. This included the unwanted middle-class civil service positions and under Constantine, the military. Constantine also tried to provide social programs for the poor to reduce the labour shortage.

Increased militarization
All the barracks emperors based their power on the military and on the soldiers of the field armies, not on the Praetorians in Rome. Thus, Rome lost its role as the political center of the empire during the third century, although it remained ideologically important. In order to legitimize and secure their rule, the emperors of the third century needed above all military successes.

The centre of decision-making shifted away from Rome and to wherever the emperor was with his armies, typically, in the east. This led to the transfer of the capital to the four cities Milan, Trier, Nicomedia, and Sirmium, and then to Constantinople. The Senate ceased to be the main governing organ and instead members of the equestrian class who filled the military officer corps became increasingly prominent.

Emperors 

Several emperors who rose to power through acclamation of their troops attempted to create stability by giving their descendants the title of Augustus and so making them co-emperors who later succeeded to the throne after their death or on some occasions their relatives managed to become an emperor immediately after their death. This led to the creation of several brief dynasties.

Non-dynastic

Gordian dynasty

Non-dynastic

Decian dynasty

Non-dynastic

Valerian dynasty

Claudian dynasty

Non-dynastic

Tacitan dynasty

Non-dynastic

Caran dynasty

See also
 Bagaudae
 Sengoku period – a similar period in Japanese history
 Warring States period and Three Kingdoms period – similar periods in Chinese history
 Jublains archeological site documents some effects of the crisis in what is now western France

Citations

General bibliography 
 
 
 Olivier Hekster, Rome and Its Empire, AD 193–284 (Edinburgh, 2008). .
 Klaus-Peter Johne (ed.), Die Zeit der Soldatenkaiser (Akademie Verlag, Berlin 2008).
 Lot, Ferdinand. End of the Ancient World and the Beginnings of the Middle Ages (Harper Torchbooks Printing, New York, 1961.  First English printing by Alfred A. Knopf, Inc., 1931).
 Moss, H. St. L. B. The Birth of the Middle Ages (Clarendon Press, 1935, reprint Oxford University Press, January 2000). .
 Watson, Alaric. Aurelian and the Third Century (Taylor & Francis, 2004) 
 White, John F. Restorer of the World: The Roman Emperor Aurelian (Spellmount, 2004)

Further reading
  Crisis of the Third Century, Hugh Kramer.
 Map, University of Calgary.
 The Crisis of the Third Century, OSU.

 
3rd century in the Roman Empire